is a 1957 black-and-white Japanese film drama directed by Koreyoshi Kurahara.  "I Am Waiting" was part of the Nikkatsu film studio's wave of Japanese noir films, in order to compete with popular American and French films in Japanese box offices. This film was made available in North America when Janus Films released a special set of Nikkatsu Noir films as part of the Criterion Collection. These films include Rusty Knife, Take Aim at the Police Van, Cruel Gun Story and A Colt Is My Passport.

"I Am Waiting" was one of Nikkatsu's earlier successes.

Plot
On a dark night, former boxer Jōji Shimaki (Yujiro Ishihara) meets Saeko (Mie Kitahara), a club singer on the verge of suicide. They live and work together at a restaurant where they begin to fall in love, struggling to escape from their dark pasts. Jōji deals with his failure as a boxer, shamed of having been barred from the ring. Saeko hopes to hide from gangsters who have forced her to work at their cabaret. She seeks his help as she is trying to run away from her gangster boss, who is forcing her to continue working even though she no longer has a talented voice due to illnesses.

They both find their source of support in their sole dreams: he wishes to go to Brazil to join his brother on a ranch, and she dreams of finding love. During the quest for his brother, Jōji discovers the horrible truth of the situation. His brother never made it to Brazil. Instead, a group of gangsters killed him for his money. Continuously pushed away by gangsters, they learn that dreams are easily crushed.

Cast
 Yujiro Ishihara -Jôji Shimaki
 Mie Kitahara - Saeko
 Hideaki Nitani -Shibata (older)
 Isamu Kosugi -Uchiyama 
Ken Hatano - Shibata (younger)
Kôjirô Kusanagi - Takeda
Naoki Sugiura - Shibata's brother
Kenjiro Uemura - Police detective

References

External links

1957 films
Japanese black-and-white films
1950s Japanese-language films
Films directed by Koreyoshi Kurahara
Nikkatsu films
Films scored by Masaru Sato
1957 directorial debut films